Emch or EMCH may refer to:

Arnold Emch (1871-1959), American mathematician
Early and Medieval Chinese History, an academic journal
Enam Medical College and Hospital, a medical school in Bangladesh
EMCh, Early Middle Chinese